Am ol Deyay-e Yek (also Romanized as Ām ol Deyāy-e Yek) is a village in Gheyzaniyeh Rural District, in the Central District of Ahvaz County, Khuzestan Province, Iran. At the 2006 census, its population was 47, in 10 families.

References 

Populated places in Ahvaz County